The 2016 Rugby Football League Championship, known as Kingstone Press Championship due to sponsorship by Kingstone Press Cider, was a rugby league football competition played in the UK, one tier below the first tier Super League. The 2016 season was the second to consist of a new structure combining the championship and super league divisions three quarters of the way through the season.

The 2016 Championship featured 12 teams, which all played one another twice in the regular season, once at home, and once away, totalling 22 games. The 2016 season also featured the "Summer Bash Weekend" for a second time. This is a 23rd round of fixtures which replicates Super League's Magic Weekend concept for the Championship sides. After these 23 rounds in both the Championship and the Super League, the two divisions of twelve were split into three divisions of eight, the "Super 8's".

Following the split into the Super 8's, the top four teams in the Championship 2016 joined the bottom four teams of the Super League 2016 in the qualifiers. This group saw each team play each other once each, totalling seven extra games, with points reset to zero for the qualifiers. After seven extra rounds, the top three teams earned a place in the Super League competition for 2017, thus either retaining or earning a place in the top competition. The teams finishing 4th and 5th in the qualifiers played off in an extra fixture, hosted by the fourth-place side, for the final place in the 2017 Super League competition. The loser of this fixture, along with teams finishing 6th, 7th, and 8th in the qualifiers, were either relegated to or remained in the Championship for the 2017 season.

Teams finishing after 23 rounds between 5th and 12th in the Championship played in the third of the three "Super 8" groups, "The Championship Shield". This saw each team playing each other once more, but with points from the original season retained. Following the additional seven rounds a four-team play-off took place pitting 1st vs 4th and 2nd vs 3rd, with the winners playing each other in the final to win the new "Championship Shield". The two teams finishing at the bottom of this group of eight were relegated to the 2017 Kingstone Press League One, being replaced by two promoted teams from the 2016 League 1 competition.

Relegation to League 1 was in place for the 2016 season, with the two bottom teams from "The Championship Shield" group after the split suffering the drop, with promotion to the Super League being available to teams finishing in the top four after 23 rounds. All of the teams in the 2016 Championship also competed in the 2016 Challenge Cup, where they entered in the third round.

Teams
This year's competition featured 12 teams. The teams consisted of ten of the 12 teams from 2015, the champion of the 2015 Championship 1 season, Oldham, and the champion of the Championship 1 playoffs, Swinton Lions. Doncaster and Hunslet Hawks, who finished in the bottom two in 2015, were relegated to League One for 2016.

Table

See also
 Championship
 2015 RFL Championship
 British rugby league system
 Super League
 Rugby League Conference
 Northern Ford Premiership
 National League Cup
 Rugby League Reserve Team Championship

References

External links
Official website

2016 in English rugby league
2016 in Welsh rugby league
Rugby Football League Championship